Samut Prakan Futsal Club (Thai สโมสรฟุตซอลสมุทรปราการ) is a Thai Futsal club based in Samut Prakan Province. The club currently plays in the Thailand Futsal League.

External links 
 Samut Prakan Futsal Club

Futsal clubs in Thailand
Sport in Samut Prakan province
Futsal clubs established in 2006
2006 establishments in Thailand